Don P. Giddens was the Dean of the College of Engineering at the Georgia Institute of Technology from 2002 to 2011. He is father of Olympic athlete Eric Giddens.

In 1999, Giddens was elected as a member into the National Academy of Engineering for contributions to the understanding of the ultrasound and fluid mechanics of arteriosclerosis, and enhancing academic bioengineering education.

He was the president of the American Society for Engineering Education for the 2011–2012 term.

References

External links
 GT COE Official profile
 GT Biomedical Engineering Official profile
 University of Rhode Island profile

Living people
Georgia Tech faculty
Georgia Tech alumni
Presidents of the American Society for Engineering Education
Members of the United States National Academy of Engineering
Year of birth missing (living people)